The Algarve Open was a men's professional golf tournament played from 1969 to 1972 in the Algarve in Southern Portugal. The 1969 and 1972 events were held at Penina Golf, Portimão. In 1970 it was held at Vilamoura while in 1971 it was held at Vale do Lobo. Total prize money was £5,500 in 1969, £7,000 in 1971 and £6,000 in 1972.

In 1972, neither the Algarve Open nor the Portuguese Open, which was played the following week, counted for the British PGA Order of Merit and as such are not included as part of what has since been officially designated as the first season of the European Tour.

Winners

References

Golf tournaments in Portugal
Recurring sporting events established in 1969
Recurring sporting events disestablished in 1972